The Spain national football team has represented Spain in international men's football competitions since 1920. It is governed by the Royal Spanish Football Federation, the governing body for football in Spain.

Spain is one of eight national teams to have been crowned world champions, having participated in a total of 16 of 22 FIFA World Cups and qualifying consistently since 1978. Spain also won three continental titles, having appeared at 11 of 16 UEFA European Championships. Spain currently competes in League A of the UEFA Nations League alongside the other top teams of Europe. Their best result was in the 2020–21 season where they reached the final, losing to France.

Spain is the only national team to win three consecutive major titles, including two back-to-back European Championships in 2008 and 2012, while becoming the first European team to win a FIFA World Cup held outside of Europe in 2010. From 2008 to 2013, Spain won the FIFA Team of the Year, the second-most of any nation, behind only Brazil. From the start of 2007 to the 2009 FIFA Confederations Cup, Spain achieved 35 consecutive undefeated matches, a feat which they shared with Brazil, and a sport record at the time. Their achievements have led many experts and commentators to consider the 2008–2012 Spain squads one of the best ever sides in the history of world football.

History

Spain has been a member of FIFA since FIFA's founding in 1904, even though the Spanish Football Federation was first established in 1909. The first Spain national football team was constituted in 1920, with the main objective of finding a team that would represent Spain at the 1920 Summer Olympics held in Belgium in that same year. Spain made their debut at the tournament on 28 August 1920 against Denmark, silver medalists at the last two Olympic tournaments. Spain managed to win that match by a scoreline of 1–0, eventually finishing with the silver medal. Spain qualified for their first FIFA World Cup in 1934, defeating Brazil in their first game and losing in a replay to the hosts and eventual champions Italy in the quarter-finals. The Spanish Civil War and World War II prevented Spain from playing any competitive matches between the 1934 World Cup and the 1950 edition's qualifiers. At the 1950 finals in Brazil, they topped their group to progress to the finals round, then finished in fourth place. Until 2010, this had been Spain's highest finish in a FIFA World Cup finals, which had given them the name of the "underachievers".

Spain won its first major international title when hosting the 1964 European Nations' Cup held in Spain, defeating the Soviet Union 2–1 in the finals at the Santiago Bernabéu Stadium. The victory would stand as Spain's lone major title for 44 years. Spain was selected as host of the 1982 FIFA World Cup, reaching the second round and four years later they reached the quarter-finals before a penalty shootout defeat to Belgium. Also at UEFA Euro 1984 they lost the final against France. Spain reached the quarter-finals of the 1994 World Cup. The match became controversial when Italian defender Mauro Tassotti struck Luis Enrique with his elbow inside Spain's penalty area, causing Luis Enrique to bleed profusely from his nose and mouth, but the foul was not noticed nor sanctioned by referee Sándor Puhl. Had the official acknowledged the foul, Spain would have merited a penalty kick. In the 2002 World Cup, Spain won its three group play matches, then defeated the Republic of Ireland on penalties in the second round. They faced co-hosts South Korea in the quarter-finals, losing in a shootout after having two goals controversially called back for alleged infractions during regular and extra time.

At UEFA Euro 2008, Spain won all their games in Group D. Italy were the opponents in the quarter-finals match, which Spain won 4–2 on penalties. They then met Russia again in the semi-finals, beating them 3–0. In the final, Spain defeated Germany 1–0, with Fernando Torres scoring the only goal of the game. This was Spain's first major title since the 1964 European Championship. Xavi was awarded the player of the tournament. The following year the side finished third at the 2009 FIFA Confederations Cup breaking their 35-match unbeaten streak that began in November 2006 after a loss to the United States. In the 2010 World Cup, Spain advanced to the final for the first time ever by defeating Germany 1–0. In the decisive match against the Netherlands, Andrés Iniesta scored the match's only goal, coming in extra time. Spain became the third team to win a World Cup outside their own continent, and the first European team to do so. Goalkeeper Iker Casillas won the golden glove for only conceding two goals during the tournament, while David Villa won the bronze ball and silver boot, tied for top scorer of the tournament. Spain qualified top of Group I in qualification for UEFA Euro 2012 with a perfect 100% record. They became the first team to retain the European Championship, winning the final 4–0 against Italy, while Fernando Torres won the Golden Boot for top scorer of the tournament.

Spain advanced to the final of the 2013 FIFA Confederations Cup, losing to hosts Brazil, and the following year they were eliminated from the group stage of the 2014 World Cup. At Euro 2016 and the 2018 World Cup, the side reached the last 16 in both tournaments losing to Italy 2-0 and Russia 3-2 on penalties after a 1-1 draw. In the UEFA Euro 2020, held in 2021 after COVID-19 pandemic caused delays, Spain made a breakthrough, reaching the last four of a major tournament for the first time since 2012, before losing to eventual champions Italy 4-2 on penalties after a 1-1 draw. The team finished the tournament with two wins and four draws (including two penalty shootouts). The same year they managed to reach the 2021 UEFA Nations League Final, losing against France. In the 2022 World Cup, Spain finished second in their group, then in the round of 16, they lost to Morocco 3–0 on penalties after a 0–0 draw, to be the third consecutive elimination from a major tournament in penalty shootouts.

Team image

Nicknames
Spain's team is commonly known by fans as "La Furia Roja", meaning the Red Fury in Spanish. recalling the "Sack of Antwerp" - an episode in the military history of Spain. However, there are another unofficial nicknames to refer to the national team of Spain.

The other most common nickname, known by fans, is "Los Toros" (Fighting Bulls), since Spanish Fighting Bull is one of Spain's famous national treasures and often used to define Spanish culture, and also often depicted by Spanish supporters alike. The Spain football team is sometimes referred as the Bulls due to this cultural heritage.

The Spanish team also received other nicknames, mostly "Toreros" or "Matador" (Bullfighters in Spanish), to describe its passionate and romantic style of football playing.

Style of play

Between 2008 and 2012, the team played a style of football dubbed 'tiki-taka', a systems approach to football founded upon the ideal of team unity and a comprehensive understanding in the geometry of space on a football field.

Tiki-taka has been variously described as "a style of play based on making your way to the back of the net through short passing and movement", a "short passing style in which the ball is worked carefully through various channels", and a "nonsensical phrase that has come to mean short passing, patience and possession above all else". The style involves roaming movement and positional interchange amongst midfielders, moving the ball in intricate patterns, and sharp, one or two-touch passing. Tiki-taka is "both defensive and offensive in equal measure" – the team is always in possession, so doesn't need to switch between defending and attacking. Commentators have contrasted tiki-taka with "Route One physicality" and with the higher-tempo passing of Barcelona and Arsène Wenger's 2007–08 Arsenal side, which employed Cesc Fàbregas as the only channel between defence and attack. Tiki-taka is associated with flair, creativity, and touch, but can also be taken to a "slow, directionless extreme" that sacrifices effectiveness for aesthetics.

Tiki-taka was successfully employed by Spain to win Euro 2008, the 2010 World Cup and Euro 2012. The 2008–12 teams are regarded as being among the greatest of international teams in football history.

Sid Lowe identifies Luis Aragonés' tempering of tiki-taka with pragmatism as a key factor in Spain's success in Euro 2008. Aragonés used tiki-taka to "protect a defense that appeared suspect [...], maintain possession and dominate games" without taking the style to "evangelical extremes". None of Spain's first six goals in the tournament came from tiki-taka: five came from direct breaks and one from a set play. For Lowe, Spain's success in the 2010 World Cup was evidence of the meeting of two traditions in Spanish football: the "powerful, aggressive, direct" style that earned the silver medal-winning 1920 Antwerp Olympic team the nickname La Furia Roja ("The Red Fury") and the tiki-taka style of the contemporary Spain's team, which focused on a collective, short-passing, technical and possession-based game.

Analyzing Spain's semi-final victory over Germany at the 2010 World Cup, Raphael Honigstein described Spain's tiki-taka style as "the most difficult version of football possible: an uncompromising passing game, coupled with intense, high pressing". For Honigstein, tiki-taka is "a significant upgrade" of the Netherlands' Total Football because it relies on ball movement rather than players switching position. Tiki-taka allowed Spain to "control both the ball and the opponent".

Kits and crest

Spain's kit is traditionally a red jersey with yellow trim, dark blue shorts and black socks, whilst their current away kit is all predominantly white. The colour of the socks altered throughout the 1990s from black to the same blue colour as the shorts, matching either the blue of the shorts or the red of the shirt until the mid-2010s when they returned to their traditional black. Spain's kits have been produced by manufacturers including Adidas (from 1981 until 1983), Le Coq Sportif (from 1983 until 1991) and Adidas once again (since 1991). Rather than displaying the logo of the Spanish football federation, Spain's jersey traditionally features the country's coat of arms over the left side. After winning the 2010 World Cup, the World Cup winners badge was added to the right side of the jersey and a golden star at the top of Spain's coat of arms.

Kit suppliers

Home stadium

Spain does not have a designated national stadium. The capital city of Madrid (Bernabéu and Metropolitano), Seville (Pizjuán, La Cartuja and Villamarín), Valencia (Mestalla and Orriols) and Barcelona (Camp Nou and Montjuïc), are the four Spanish cities that have hosted more than 15 national team matches, while also being home to the largest stadiums in the country.

Other friendly matches, as well as qualifying fixtures against smaller opponents, are played in provincial stadia. The 2018 FIFA World Cup qualification campaign included matches at the Reino de León in León, Los Cármenes in Granada, El Molinón in Gijón, and the Rico Pérez in Alicante.

Media coverage
Spain's UEFA European Qualifiers and UEFA Nations League matches, and all friendly games from 2018 until 2022, will be televised nationwide by La 1, flagship television channel of the public broadcaster TVE.

Rivalries
Spain has three main rivalries with other top footballing nations.

 Their rivalry with Italy, sometimes referred to as the Mediterranean Derby, contested since 1920. Although the two nations are not immediate geographical neighbours, their rivalry at international level is enhanced by the strong performances of the representative clubs in UEFA competitions, in which they are among the leading associations and have each enjoyed spells of dominance. Since the quarter-finals match between the two countries at Euro 2008, the rivalry has renewed, with its most notable match between the two sides being in the UEFA Euro 2012 Final, which Spain won 4–0.
 Their rivalry with Portugal, also known as the Iberian Derby, is one of the oldest football rivalries at a national level. It began on 18 December 1921, when Portugal lost 3–1 to Spain at Madrid in their first ever international friendly game. Portugal lost their first matches, with their first draw (2–2) only coming in 1926. Portugal's first win came much later (4–1) in 1947. Both belong to the strongest football nations of the world, and have met a total of 39 times (of which 9 matches were competitive) which resulted in 16 victories for Spain, 17 draws and 6 victories for Portugal.
 Their rivalry with France, also another major football force, is also one of the oldest at a national level. Spain and France have met a total of 36 times, began with a 4–0 triumph for Spain in a friendly in Bordeaux on 30 April 1922, though their first competitive meeting came in the UEFA Euro 1984 Final, which France won to take over its first major international honours. Spain has the advantage in head-to-head competition with 16 wins, 13 losses and 7 draws, though France has gotten more international glories than Spain.

Results and fixtures

The following matches were played or are scheduled to be played by the national team in the current or upcoming seasons.

2022

2023

Coaching staff

Players

Current squad
The following 26 players were named in the squad for the UEFA Euro 2024 qualifying matches against Norway and Scotland on 25 March 2023 and 28 March 2023.

On the 17th of March, Pedri withdrew from the squad due to injury and was replaced by Yeremy Pino on the 19th.

On the 19th of March, Gerard Moreno withdrew from the squad due to injury and was replaced by Borja Iglesias.

Caps and goals updated as of 6 December 2022, after the match against Morocco.

Recent call-ups
The following players have also been called up for the team in the last twelve months.

INJ Player withdrew from the squad due to an injury
PRE Preliminary squad / standby
WD Player withdrew from the squad due to non-injury issue
RET Player retired from the national team
SUS Player is serving suspension

Previous squads
World Cup
 1934 FIFA World Cup squad
 1950 FIFA World Cup squad
 1962 FIFA World Cup squad
 1966 FIFA World Cup squad
 1978 FIFA World Cup squad
 1982 FIFA World Cup squad
 1986 FIFA World Cup squad
 1990 FIFA World Cup squad
 1994 FIFA World Cup squad
 1998 FIFA World Cup squad
 2002 FIFA World Cup squad
 2006 FIFA World Cup squad
 2010 FIFA World Cup squad
 2014 FIFA World Cup squad
 2018 FIFA World Cup squad
 2022 FIFA World Cup squad
European Championship
 UEFA Euro 1964 squad
 UEFA Euro 1980 squad
 UEFA Euro 1984 squad
 UEFA Euro 1988 squad
 UEFA Euro 1996 squad
 UEFA Euro 2000 squad
 UEFA Euro 2004 squad
 UEFA Euro 2008 squad
 UEFA Euro 2012 squad
 UEFA Euro 2016 squad
 UEFA Euro 2020 squad
UEFA Nations League Finals
 2021 UEFA Nations League Finals squad
Confederations Cup
 2009 FIFA Confederations Cup squad
 2013 FIFA Confederations Cup squad
Olympic Games
 1920 Olympic Games squad
 1924 Olympic Games squad
 1928 Olympic Games squad

Individual records

Player records

Sergio Ramos holds the record for most appearances for the Spain's team with 180. In second place is Iker Casillas with 167, followed by Sergio Busquets with 143.

David Villa holds the title of Spain's highest goalscorer, scoring 59 goals from 2005 to 2017, during which time he played for Spain on 98 occasions. Raúl González is the second highest goalscorer, scoring 44 goals in 102 appearances between 1996 and 2006.

Between November 2006 and June 2009, Spain went undefeated for a record-equaling 35 consecutive matches before their loss to the United States in the Confederations Cup, a record shared with Brazil and Italy, and included a record 15-game winning streak. In the 2010 FIFA World Cup, Spain became the inaugural European national team to lift the World Cup trophy outside Europe; along with Brazil, Germany and Argentina, Spain is one of the four national team to have won the FIFA World Cup outside its home continent.

Most capped players

Below is a list of the ten players with the most caps for Spain, . 
Players in bold are still active with Spain.

Youngest capped player

Oldest capped player

Top goalscorers

Below is a list of the top ten goalscorers for Spain, .

Youngest goalscorer

Oldest goalscorer

Most goals scored in a single match

First goal scored

Captains

List of captaincy periods of the various captains throughout the years.
 1920–1929 José María Belauste (Midfielder)
 1930–1939 Ricardo Zamora (Goalkeeper)
 1949–1950 Ignacio Eizaguirre (Goalkeeper)
 1958 Marcelo Campanal (Defender)
 1962 Joan Segarra (Defender)
 1964–1965 Ferran Olivella (Defender)
 1966 Francisco Gento (Forward)
 1978 Pirri (Midfielder)
 1980 Juan Manuel Asensi (Midfielder)
 1980–1984 Luis Arconada (Goalkeeper)
 1984–1988 José Antonio Camacho (Defender)
 1988–1992 Emilio Butragueño (Forward)
 1992–1993 José Mari Bakero (Midfielder)
 1993–1998 Andoni Zubizarreta (Goalkeeper)
 1998–2002 Fernando Hierro (Defender)
 2002–2006 Raúl González Blanco (Forward)
 2006–2016 Iker Casillas (Goalkeeper)
 2016–2021 Sergio Ramos (Defender)
 2021–2022 Sergio Busquets (Midfielder)

Manager records

 Most manager appearances
Vicente del Bosque: 114

Team records

 Most consecutive wins (including friendlies): 15 (2008–2009)
 Most consecutive wins achieved by an international coach from debut: 13 – Vicente del Bosque

Competitive record

FIFA World Cup

 Champions   Runners-up   Third place   Tournament played fully or partially on home soil

UEFA European Championship

UEFA Nations League

*Draws include knockout matches decided on penalty kicks.

FIFA Confederations Cup

Head-to-head record

All-time results

The following table shows Spain's all-time international record, correct as of 14 June 2021.

FIFA Rankings
Last update was on 28 November 2019.  
Source:

Honours

Title
FIFA World Cup
 Champions: 2010
  Fourth place: 1950
UEFA European Championship
 Champions: 1964, 2008, 2012
 Runners-up: 1984
 Third place: 2020
UEFA Nations League
 Runners-up: 2021
FIFA Confederations Cup
 Runners-up: 2013
 Third place: 2009
Olympic Games
  Gold medal: 1992
  Silver medal: 1920, 2000, 2020

AwardsFIFA Fair Play Trophy Winners: 2006, 2010, 2013, 2018FIFA Team of the Year Winners: 2008, 2009, 2010, 2011, 2012, 2013Prince of Asturias Award for Sports Winners: 2010Laureus World Team of the Year Winners:''' 2011

See also

 Spain national under-23 football team (Olympic football team)
 Spain national under-21 football team
 Spain national under-20 football team
 Spain national under-19 football team
 Spain national under-18 football team
 Spain national under-17 football team
 Spain national under-16 football team
 Spain national under-15 football team
 Spain women's national football team
 Spain women's national under-23 football team
 Spain women's national under-20 football team
 Spain women's national under-19 football team
 Spain women's national under-17 football team
 La Liga
 Football in Spain
 Sport in Spain

Notes

References

External links

  by RFEF
 Spain at FIFA
 Spain at UEFA

Spain national football team
European national association football teams
UEFA European Championship-winning countries
FIFA World Cup-winning countries
Laureus World Sports Awards winners